Circus In The Sky is the fifth studio album by the Australian hip hop trio Bliss n Eso, following 2010's Running On Air. It was released on 28 June 2013 through Illusive Sounds. Bliss N Eso began recording the album in late 2012. The album revolves around themes such as optimism, freedom, and peace. The album instantly reached No. 1 on the iTunes albums chart upon release, and debuted at No. 1 on the ARIA Albums Chart. The album was positively received and was accredited gold. Bliss N Eso toured in support for the album on the House Of Dreams Tour in 2013 and the Circus Under The Stars Tour in 2014. Circus In The Sky was nominated for an ARIA Music Award for Best Urban Album.

Background
Bliss N Eso began recording Circus In The Sky in late 2012, a large portion of the album in a portable studio while touring. It was also Bliss N Eso's first album with live strings. Bliss said "We've felt like we've evolved, really pushed ourselves creatively, and pushed the boundaries".

Singles

The first single "House Of Dreams" was released on 8 March 2013, the second single "Home Is Where the Heart Is" on 10 May, the third single "Reservoir Dogs" on 21 June, the fourth single "Act Your Age" on 16 August, and the fifth single "My Life" on 11 November. The singles peaked on the ARIA Singles Chart at No. 45, No. 31, No. 96, No. 31, and No. 26 respectively and finished at No. 94, No. 135, No. 123, No. 67, and No. 167 on the Triple J Hottest 100 respectively. "My Life" would go on to be Bliss N Eso's highest charting single and would be accredited gold along with "Act Your Age".

Track listing

Charts

Weekly charts

Year-end charts

Certifications

References

2013 albums
Bliss n Eso albums